Neal Christopher Ardley (born 1 September 1972) is an English professional football manager and former player who played as a right midfielder. He is currently the manager of Solihull Moors.

Ardley was capped at Under-21 level by England. Ardley spent the majority of his career with Wimbledon, making his debut for them on 20 April 1991 at the age of 18 in a 2–1 away win over Aston Villa in the Football League First Division. He went on to make over 100 appearances for Watford before having spells at Cardiff City and Millwall.

Ardley announced his retirement from professional football on 30 August 2007 after suffering a series of injuries. On the same day, Ardley announced that he would return to former club Cardiff City having been appointed manager of the Cardiff City Youth Academy. He was the manager of AFC Wimbledon from 10 October 2012 to 12 November 2018. He took over as manager of Notts County on 23 November 2018.

Playing career

Wimbledon
Ardley was born in Epsom, Surrey. Signed by Wimbledon as a youngster, whilst at Carshalton Boys Sports College, he made his way through the youth set up until breaking into the first team. Ardley made eight league appearances for Wimbledon in the 1991–92 season, featuring more prominently in the 1992–93 campaign, in which he played in 26 games and scored four goals in the inaugural season of the FA Premier League as the Dons finished 12th. Wimbledon finished 6th in the FA Premier League in 1993–94, matching the record highest ranking achieved by the club during their first ever season in the top flight during 1986–87. Ardley's contribution was more limited during this season, however, as he was selected to play in just 16 games. He scored just once in a 2–1 win over Sheffield Wednesday on 15 January 1994. He was in and out of the side for nearly a decade afterwards, remaining with the Dons after their relegation at the end of 1999–2000. Two more seasons followed as he unsuccessfully tried to help them regain their Premier League place, before he signed for Division One rivals Watford on a free transfer on 9 August 2002.

By the time Ardley left the club in 2002 he had played a total of 245 league games for Wimbledon, scoring 18 goals. He was their longest serving player by the time of his departure. His best campaign was arguably the 1996–97 season, where he missed just four league games, helped the Dons reach the semi-finals of both the FA Cup and the Football League Cup, and oversaw an excellent season in the league where they were rarely out of the top five until having to settle for 8th place in the final table.

Watford
Ardley played for the Hornets for three seasons, making appearances an FA Cup semi final in 2003 and a League Cup semi-final in 2005.

Cardiff City
Ardley joined Cardiff City in March 2005, a day before the sacking of Watford manager Ray Lewington. He scored his first and only goal for Cardiff against Leicester City on 19 April 2005.

Millwall
Ardley joined Millwall for the 2006–07 season, his last professional season.

Managerial career

Cardiff City academy
Ardley announced his retirement from professional football on 30 August 2007 after a series of injuries. The same day he was appointed as manager of the Cardiff City academy. Ardley had started preparing for a manager's role at the early age of 24, when he took his first coaching badges before completing his training for the UEFA Pro coaching qualification in 2010. He impressed in the role by guiding several players through to the first-team squad, including highly rated pair Joe Ralls and Theo Wharton making the step-up. Ardley remained with the club for five years.

AFC Wimbledon
Ardley was appointed as manager of Football League Two side AFC Wimbledon on 10 October 2012, with former Watford teammate Neil Cox being named as assistant manager on the same day. The final two man shortlist for the job was Ardley and former Wales international Rob Page.

On 2 December 2012, Ardley managed AFC Wimbledon in their first ever meeting with MK Dons, the football club formed via his former side Wimbledon's relocation to Milton Keynes. An injury-time goal saw AFC Wimbledon lose 2–1.

Ardley made additions to his squad during the January transfer window with Alan Bennett being the most notable. In March 2013, Ardley was nominated for Football League Two Manager of the Month following Wimbledon's unbeaten run. Despite this, Wimbledon were in 23rd place going into the last match of the season with only Aldershot Town below them, however a 2–1 win at home to mid table Fleetwood Town saw Ardley lead Wimbledon to safety instead, sending Barnet down. Remarkably, Wimbledon jumped 3 places and finished in 20th (53 points; -22 GD), despite having the worst goal difference in the league.

For the start of his first full season in charge he added a number of new faces which included the likes of Charlie Sheringham. The 2013–14 season started off very brightly for the Dons beating Wycombe Wanderers, Scunthorpe United, Fleetwood Town and Burton Albion in their first four home matches leaving AFC Wimbledon sat in a Play-Off position in September. Ardley saw his side slip further down the league in the coming months which included a run of one win in eight leading into the New Year, however it still saw the Dons in a remarkably more comfortable position then when Ardley first took charge. Once again, Wimbledon finished comfortably in 20th place (53 points; -8 GD), which could have been 16th place had it not been for fielding an ineligible player.

Ardley strengthened his squad during June and into July with the signing of Matt Tubbs, Adebayo Akinfenwa and James Shea amongst others. AFC Wimbledon's first preseason friendly of 2014–15 was against Margate which saw Ardley come up against his predecessor Terry Brown. The match finished with a 3–0 defeat for Ardley's side.

As the season began, Ardley put faith in his summer signings with James Shea replacing last season's number one Ross Worner. AFC Wimbledon began the season brightly with a draw at home to Shrewsbury Town which was succeeded by fine wins over Luton Town and Southend United both of which came away from home. The club's first defeat in the league came after his side squandered a 1–0 lead at home to Hartlepool United to lose 2–1.

Ardley also managed AFC Wimbledon to their first ever victory against MK Dons on 7 October 2014. They met for the third time in the Football League Trophy with goals from Ade Azeez, Sean Rigg and Adebayo Akinfenwa securing a 3–2 win for the Dons. It would become the season of cup run after he led the club to the FA Cup Third Round after beating Wycombe Wanderers. The reward for reaching the Third Round for the first time in the newly formed club's history was a home game against Liverpool, which the Dons lost 2–1. Ardley underwent hip surgery in March 2015, leaving Neil Cox in charge for the 1–1 draw with Tranmere Rovers. Wimbledon finished in 15th place (58 points; -6 GD).

The Dons steady progress over the previous 3 seasons was the base for an extremely successful 2015–16 season. Wimbledon finished in 7th place (75 points; +14 GD), the final Play-off position, thanks to new signing Lyle Taylor's 20 League goals. After Ardley had navigated the Dons through the Play-off Semi Finals against Accrington Stanley, Ardley achieved his first managerial trophy by beating Plymouth Argyle 2–0 in the League Two Play-off Final, promoting AFC Wimbledon to League One for the first time in its history.

The 2016–17 season had the Dons finish respectably in 15th place (57 points; -3 GD) in its first season in League One, in part to Lyle Taylor and Tom Elliott's 10 and 9 League goals respectively.

The 2017–18 season saw Ardley unable to follow up and build on the previous season. The Dons disappointed and battled relegation all season but managed to stay up with an 18th-place finish (53 points; -11 GD), due to Lyle Taylor's 14 League goals and a 7-game unbeaten run over April and May.

Ardley managed an overhaul of the Dons first team throughout the 2018 summer, as a number of players left the club. The most high-profile was Lyle Taylor, who went on to be AFC Wimbledon's record Football League goal scorer with 44 goals, and the Dons' highest scorer during their Football League era with 55 goals in all competitions. The 2018 summer also saw Ardley become the 3rd longest serving manager in English League football. Ardley had more than six years in charge of the Dons.

The 2018–19 season saw the Dons carry on its unbeaten run with an opening day win away (1-0) at Fleetwood Town and followed up with a home draw (0-0) against Coventry City. Ardley oversaw a 10-game unbeaten run thanks to an away win (2-1) against Portsmouth in the First Round of the League Cup. This was the first time the Dons had made it to the Second Round since being back in English League football. Following a run of 10 defeats in 12 Football League games, Ardley left AFC Wimbledon by mutual agreement on 12 November 2018.

Notts County
Ardley was appointed as manager of Notts County on 23 November 2018, assisted by Neil Cox, with whom he worked with at AFC Wimbledon. On his arrival, Ardley said "that the chance to manage Notts County is one I couldn't let pass." The 2018–19 season ended in disappointment for Notts County and Ardley as it saw the club relegated to the National League on the final day of the season for the first time in their history.

County looked to bounce straight back to the Football League and win an immediate promotion in a season that was interrupted by the COVID-19 pandemic. In June 2020, it was decided that the Play-Offs would go ahead with County finding themselves in third place when the table was determined on a points-per-game basis. County reached the final however were beaten 3–1 by Harrogate Town who were promoted to the Football League for the first time in their history. County also reached the semi-final of the FA Trophy, again falling to defeat to Harrogate Town in a delayed match that took place in September 2020. Ardley was sacked on 24 March 2021 with the club 14 points behind the league leaders, Sutton United.

Solihull Moors
On 14 June 2021, Ardley was appointed manager of National League side Solihull Moors. After an impressive October that saw his side get four wins and two draws from six matches, Ardley was awarded the league's Manager of the Month award with his goalkeeper Ryan Boot getting the Player of the Month award, conceding only one goal in these matches.

Managerial statistics

Honours
AFC Wimbledon
League Two play-offs: 2016

Individual
League Two Manager of the Month:December 2014, April 2016
National League Manager of the Month: December 2019, January 2021, October 2021

References

External links

1972 births
Living people
Sportspeople from Epsom
Footballers from Surrey
English footballers
England under-21 international footballers
Association football midfielders
Wimbledon F.C. players
Watford F.C. players
Cardiff City F.C. players
Millwall F.C. players
Premier League players
English Football League players
English football managers
Cardiff City F.C. non-playing staff
AFC Wimbledon managers
Notts County F.C. managers
Solihull Moors F.C. managers
English Football League managers
National League (English football) managers